The following is a list of original programs of TV Nova network. Some of shows featuring already famous Czech actors (fe.: Ruská ruleta, Nováci), some of ones featuring now famous actors' and moderators' debuts (fe.: Kolotoč, Eso).

Series 
 Anatomie života (2021)
 Bóra (TBA)
 Chlap (2022)
 Dáma a Král (2017–2022)
 Dobro došli (TBA)
 Dokonalý svět (2010)
 Doktoři z Počátků (2013–2016)
 Draculův švagr (1996)
 Drazí sousedé (2016)
 Gumy (Since 2022)
 Guru(2022)
 Gympl s (r)učením omezeným (2012–2013)
 Hasiči (2011)
 Hojer (TBA)
 Iveta (2022-current)
 Jitřní záře (2022)
 Kameňák (2019–2021)
 Král Šumavy: Fantom temného kraje (2022–current)
 Kriminálka Anděl (2008–current)
 Miluju tě navždy, táta
 Místo v životě (2006–2008)
 Mužketýři (2021–2022)
 Na vodě (2016)
 Národní házená (2022)
 Okresní přebor (2010)
 O mě se neboj (2022)
 Odznak Vysočina (2022-current)
 On je žena! (2005)
 Ordinace v růžové zahradě (2005-current)
 Organised Crime Unit (2011–2016)
 Pan profesor (2021–2022)
 Pojišťovna štěstí (2004–2010)
 Policie Modrava (2015–current)
 Profesor T. (2018)
 První krok (2012)
 Případ Roubal (2021)
 Případy mimořádné Marty (2022-current)
 Redakce (2004–2006)
 Soukromé pasti (2008; 2011)
 Specialisté (2017-current)
 Straka
 Světla pasáže (2007)
 Šéfka (2022)
 Taneční (TBA)
 Ulice (2005-current)
 Vědma (TBA)
 Vegani a Jelita (2021)
 Za domem v lese (TBA)
 Zlatá labuť (2023-current)
 Sex O´Clock (2023)

Sitcoms 
 Comeback (2008–2011)
 Helena (2012–2013)
 Hospoda (1996–1997)
 Nováci (1995–1996)
 PanMáma (2013)
 Policajti z předměstí (1998)

Quiz shows 
 1 proti 100 (2004–2005)
 Babeta
 Báječný ženský (2004)
 Bingo (1994–1997)
 Chcete být milionářem? (2000–2005;2016-)
 Jsi chytřejší než páťák? (2007)
 Karambol
 Kolotoč (1996-2003)
 Nejslabší! Máte padáka! (2002–2004)
 Neřeš, nepřepínej (2006)
 Pálí vám to? (2003–2005)
 Přísně tajné! (2008)
 Riskuj na kolotoč (1999?)
 Riskuj! (1994-2004)
 Tenkrát s Lucií Vondráčkovou (2004)
 Triga
 Tyjátr (2001–?)
 Úsměv, prosím! (2004)
 Uzel
 Vox populi (1994–?)
 Zvoňte dvakrát! (2006)

Award shows
 ANNO (1995–2010)
 Česká Miss (2005–2010)
 Fotbalista roku (1998–2005)
 Miss Aerobic ČR (1996–2009)
 Miss ČR (1996–2008)
 Miss desetiletí (1997)
 Miss tisíciletí (2000)
 TýTý (2004–2008)
 Zlatá hokejka (1998–2005)

News 
 Snídaně s Novou (1994–current)
 Televizní noviny (1994–current)
 Právě dnes (1994–2004)

Reality shows 
 4 svatby (2012)
 Babicovy dobroty (2008-current)
 Bailando (TV Nova show) (2007)
 Big Brother (2005)
 Česko hledá SuperStar (2004–2006)
 Dům snů (2009)
 Farma (2012)
 MasterChef (2012)
 Milionový pár (2005)
 Robinsonův ostrov (2017-current)
 Svatby paní Veroniky (2006)
 Vem si mě! (2007)
 Výměna manželek (2005-current)
 XXL (1998–????)

Hobby-related shows
 Babicovy dobroty (2008–current)
 Grilování s Vodouchem (2012)
 Polepšovna mazlíčků (2008)
 Rady ptáka Loskutáka (2001–current)

Publicistic shows 
 112 (2006–2011)
 Česko k neuvěření (2011–2012)
 Koření (TV show) (2005-current)
 Koření (2005–current)
 Na vlastní oči (1994–2009, 2012–2013)
 Natvrdo (2008)
 Nová cestománie (2004–2006)
 Občanské judo (1994–2011)
 Příběhy bez scénáře (2010)
 Střepiny (2002-current)
 Víkend (2005-current)
 Vizita (2010)
 Volejte Novu (2003–current)
 Volejte řediteli (1994–2003)

Comedial shows 
 Country estráda (2002–2005)
 Český bodyguard (1994–?)
 Čtveráci (1999–?)
 Čundrcountry show (1994–?)
 Dobroty (2001–2003)
 Go Go šou (2000–2006)
 Gumáci (1994)
 Horoskopičiny
 Karusoshow (1997)
 Lucie na bílo
 Natočto! (1998-2005)
 Novoty (1997)
 Paškál (2003)
 Politické harašení (1995-2003)
 Příběhy bez scénáře (2010)
 Ptákoviny (1994–2000, 2002)
 Rozjezdy pro hvězdy (1997–2003)
 Ruská ruleta (1994-1996)
 Rychlý prachy (1998–?)
 Scénky na scénu (2005)
 Senzibilšou (1997–?)
 Sígři ve výslužbě (2013)
 Skopičiny (1999–?)
 Souhvězdí Novy (2000–?)
 TELE TELE (2000-2007)
 Tenkrát na východě (2004)
 To nevymyslíš! (2005)
 Zlatá mříž (1998–2006)

Talent shows
 Česko hledá SuperStar (2004-2011)
 Česko Slovenská Superstar (2009-2012)
 DO-RE-MI (1998-2004)
 Dům snů (2009-2010)
 Evergreen show (2006)
 Hlas Česko Slovenska (2012–current)
 Mléčná dráha (2003)
 Talentmania (2010)
 X Factor (2009)

Talk show 
 Áčko (1997–?)
 Gilotina
 Hogo Fogo (2000–?)
 Kotel (1998–2006)
 Mr. GS (2008–2009)
 Neviňátka (2009)
 P.F.
 Prásk! (1998–2006, 2013–current)
 Sedmička (2001–2003)
 Tabu (1994-1999)
 VIP na cestách (2005–2006)
 Zlatíčka

Other shows
 Dobré bydlo (1994–?)
 Eso (1994–2009)
 Ku-ku (2004–?)
 Maxi Clever (2006–2008)
 Mezi hvězdami (2011)
 Natvrdo (2008)
 Rande (1999)
 Věštírna (2000–?)
 Zálety (2002–?)
 Peříčko (1997–2003)
 Počasíčko (2000-2001)

References

Nova